Wu Tse-yuan (17 August 1945 – 22 September 2008) was a Taiwanese politician, known for his involvement in black gold politics, and ties to gangs.

Education and early career
Wu studied law at Central Police University after attending what became the National Pingtung University of Education. Subsequently, he enrolled at National Taiwan University's Graduate School of Building and Planning, and completed a master's degree in transportation engineering at National Chiao Tung University, followed by a doctorate in engineering at Chinese Culture University. He later pursued further education at the Graduate Program of Building and Construction within the University of London.

Political career
A protégé of Lee Teng-hui, Wu was also close to Wang Jin-pyng and Lien Chan. As leader of the Taiwan Provincial Planning and Developing Department from 1988 to 1992, Wu began taking kickbacks from a company installing water pumps in Banqiao District. He contested the 1993 local elections as a Kuomintang candidate for the magistracy of Pingtung County and won reelection in 1997. Wu was indicted in 1996 for his actions in Banqiao, but not detained until a 1997 court order and had been released on medical parole in 1998. Later that year, local media reported Wu's expulsion from the Kuomintang. He gained legal immunity in December via his election to the Legislative Yuan, as a representative for Pingtung County. In January 2000, Wu Tse-yuan and Lien Chan were accused of land speculation in Wuqi, Taichung, dating back to 1993. On 30 November 2000, the Taiwan High Court sentenced Wu to fifteen years imprisonment for the Banqiao corruption case. A week later, the Executive Yuan proposed an amendment to the Public Officials Election and Recall Law targeting Wu and other politicians involved with black gold politics. The amendment sought to bar anyone serving a suspended sentence, a sentence longer than ten years imprisonment, or a death sentence from seeking public office. In addition, convicted racketeers released within ten years of an election would also be illegible for that election cycle. In March 2001, Wu was indicted in another corruption scandal involving the Pali Sewage Treatment Plant. He, Lo Fu-chu, and other legislators planned on founding a new political group affiliated with Lee Teng-hui in 2001, but the proposal was postponed that July. Wu left for Japan on 29 December 2001 as part of a junket, and never returned to Taiwan. He was tracked to Guangzhou some time later.

In 2004, Taiwan Pineapple Group executive Huang Tsung-hung claimed that he bribed Wu in 1999 and asked Wu to help him secure a loan for his company.

Personal life
Wu Jin-lin is his younger brother. The younger Wu ran for a Pingtung County seat in the legislative elections of 2004, and won. The Apple Daily was the first Taiwanese publication to report Wu Tse-yuan's death in September 2008, but immediately afterward, both Wu Jin-lin and the Ministry of Justice refused to confirm media reports.

References

Members of the 4th Legislative Yuan
Magistrates of Pingtung County
1945 births
2008 deaths
Pingtung County Members of the Legislative Yuan
Expelled members of the Kuomintang
Taiwanese politicians convicted of corruption
Taiwanese politicians convicted of bribery
National Pingtung University of Education alumni
National Taiwan University alumni
National Chiao Tung University alumni
Chinese Culture University alumni
Alumni of the University of London
Taiwanese expatriates in China
Fugitives wanted by Taiwan
Fugitives wanted on bribery charges
Central Police University alumni